Abulfaz Elchibey (24 June 1938 – 22 August 2000) was an Azerbaijani political figure and a former Soviet dissident. His real name was Abulfaz Gadirgulu oghlu Aliyev (Azerbaijani: Əbülfəz Qədirqulu oğlu Əliyev), but he assumed the nickname of "Elçibəy" (Azerbaijani for the "noble messenger") upon his leadership of the Azerbaijani Popular Front in 1990. Elchibey was the president of Azerbaijan, serving from 17 June 1992 until his overthrow in a coup d'état on 24 June 1993. He positioned himself as an overt pan-Turkist, and strongly anti-Iran.

Biography 

Elchibey studied Arabic at the Baku State University, graduated in 1957 from the department of Arab philology of the Faculty of Oriental Studies. He worked as a translator and later as a lecturer of history at the Baku State University. From 1963 to 1964 he practiced in Egypt, working as a translator. He soon joined a dissident movement, supporting the re-establishment of Azebaijani independence. From 1975 to 1976 he was imprisoned. Thereafter he worked at the Institute of Manuscripts of Azerbaijan and published over 50 scientific works on Oriental philosophy, history, literature and religion.

Presidency

Assumption of power 
Elchibey's rise to presidency came after the first round of heavy losses of Azerbaijan in the war against Armenia over the Nagorno-Karabakh region. After the Khojaly Massacre (26–27 February 1992), the fall of Shusha (8 May 1992) and Lachin (15–17 May 1992), the temporary Azerbaijani communist establishment led by Yaqub Mammadov could no longer hold power. Amidst the disorder on the frontline, former Azerbaijani president Ayaz Mutalibov's attempted comeback, two months after his resignation, in a parliamentary coup on 14 May 1992, resulted in public outrage and military overthrow of Mutalibov by the Azerbaijani Popular Front in Baku on 15 May 1992.

The national presidential elections with 7 candidates were held on 7 June 1992 in which Elchibey was elected the President of Azerbaijan, gaining 54% of votes and becoming Azerbaijan's first democratically elected, non-communist president.

Domestic policies

Military and security policy 
During the summer of 1992, Elchibey secured the full withdrawal of the Soviet 4th Army and other elements of the Transcaucasus Military District from Azerbaijan, which became the first and only former Soviet republic (after the Baltic states) free of Soviet military presence. At the same time, Elchibey's government established the national Azeri Navy and managed to reach an agreement with Russia on receiving one-quarter of the Soviet Caspian Flotilla based in Baku. Upon his election, Elchibey appointed İsgandar Hamidov, a police colonel and the leader of the newly established Grey Wolves movement in Azerbaijan, as the Minister of Interior. Hamidov, despite his personal devotion and contributions in capturing Agdere district of Azerbaijan, proved to be generally incompetent and resigned in April 1993 after the fall of Kelbajar.

Karabakh 
In June 1992, the Azerbaijani army started a counter-offensive codenamed Operation Goranboy in Nagorno-Karabakh, establishing control of over 40% of the region by the fall of 1992 and approaching within 7 kilometers of Shusha. However, as the Azerbaijani offensive pushed further into Karabakh, it became further bogged down in controversy, mismanagement, corruption and treachery by Elchibey-appointed Defense Minister Rahim Qaziyev, along with the guerilla tactics of the NKR Army in mountain warfare. This led to unexpectedly heavy Azeri casualties, loss of heavy military equipment, and the campaign ending in failure.

Foreign policy
On 18 August 1992, Elchibey signed a decree on Azerbaijan's entry into the International Monetary Fund and the International Bank for Reconstruction and Development. On 7 and 8 September 1992, former British Prime Minister Margaret Thatcher visited Baku on an unofficial visit as a guest of Elchibey. During her visit, she oversaw the signing ceremony of an agreement between Azerbaijan, British Petroleum and Statoil on exploratory work at the Chirag oilfield. In this respect, one of Elchibey's goals in inviting Thatcher was to attract foreign entrepreneurs looking to do business in Azerbaijan. During a reception at the Gulustan Palace, he described Thatcher as one that played a role in Azerbaijan achieving independence, saying that "she can see the fruits of the tree she planted".

Turkey
In 1992, during a visit to the Turkish capital of Ankara, Elchibey described himself as a soldier of Atatürk (founder and the first president of Turkish Republic). He also held some Pan-Turanian views, for which he enjoyed the support of the leader of Turkey's Nationalist Movement Party, Colonel Alparslan Türkeş. In April 1993, he attended the funeral of President Turgut Özal in Istanbul, a person who shared his beliefs for a potential Turkic union from the former Soviet Union.

Russia
During his one-year rule, Azerbaijani–Russian relations were damaged, with his politics being described in this regard as "Anti-Russian." He was noted for using an interpreter when speaking to Russian figures, despite being fluent in the Russian language as he was educated in the USSR. Often teasing the Russian leadership, once declaring that among the Russian men who did the greatest services to democracy Tatar President Mintimer Shaimiev, saying in a congratulatory telegram sent in connection with the adoption of a new Tatar constitution that "the heroic Tatar people" have contributed to the "awakening and revival of the Turkic world". On 12 September 1992, he paid a visit to Moscow, during which he signed along with Boris Yeltsin, the "Treaty on Friendship, Cooperation and Mutual Security between the Republic of Azerbaijan and the Russian Federation".

Iran
He was described as being "vehemently anti-Iranian" in his policies, this being due in part to their perception of an Iranian-Armenian alliance. Elchibey endorsed the unification of Azerbaijan with the region that is known as Iranian Azerbaijan, a stance which alienated the Iranian government in Tehran. During a visit to Turkey, he called for the downfall of the Iranian Islamic Republic, which prompted a member of the Iranian parliament to threaten retaliation against the Azeris.

Other states
Elchibey paid a visit to Ukraine on 12 November 1992, during which he said that relations with Ukraine will be prioritized by Azerbaijan from the former republics of the former Soviet Union.

Downfall 
As rebellious troops were advancing onto Baku, President Elchibey invited Heydar Aliyev, former Soviet Politburo member and then head of Nakhchivan (and no relation to Elchibey, whose real surname was Aliyev), to Baku on 9 June 1993 for negotiations with Surat Huseynov. Aliyev quickly took control of the power, becoming the Chairman of the Azerbaijani parliament on 15 June 1993 and giving a chair of the Prime-Minister of the country to Huseynov. Nine days later, in the vacuum of power left by Elchibey's departure to Nakhchivan, Aliyev, as a speaker of the parliament, constitutionally assumed presidential powers. He signed the Bishkek Protocol to cease hostilities on the frontline, and further solidified his power by organizing impeachment hearings and holding a national referendum on 29 August 1993, which formally stripped Elchibey of the presidency. In another national election, on 3 October 1993, Heydar Aliyev, was elected as president of Azerbaijan with 99% of the votes.

Opposition and death

During Aliyev's presidency, Elchibey returned to Baku in 1997 and joined the opposition as the leader of Azerbaijani Popular Front Party.

In 2000, Elchibey was diagnosed with prostate cancer and died in August of the same year in a military hospital in Ankara, Turkey. His body was flown to Baku and given the state funeral at the Alley of Honor with special attendance by then-President Heydar Aliyev.

The Elchibey Institute in Azerbaijan was created on 17 November 2020 in Baku with the aim to promote the national ideology and policies of Elchibey.

See also
 President of Azerbaijan
 Politics of Azerbaijan
 National Assembly of Azerbaijan
 Foreign relations of Azerbaijan
 List of political parties in Azerbaijan
 Whole Azerbaijan
 Azerbaijan National Resistance Organization

References 

1938 births
2000 deaths
Presidents of Azerbaijan
People from the Nakhchivan Autonomous Republic
Azerbaijani Popular Front Party politicians
Burials at Alley of Honor
Pan-Turkists
Soviet dissidents
Azerbaijani anti-communists
Leaders ousted by a coup
Baku State University alumni
Azerbaijani nationalists
Deaths from cancer in Turkey
Deaths from prostate cancer
Anti-Iranian sentiments